Deep Into It is an album released by Larry Carlton in 2001. "I Can't Tell You Why" was originally recorded by Eagles in 1979. "Roll with It" was originally recorded by Steve Winwood in 1988.

Track listing 
All tracks by Larry Carlton except where noted
 "Put It Where You Want It" (Larry Carlton, Joe Sample)  – 4:15
 "Deep into It" (Larry Carlton, Carl Burnett) – 4:20
 Don't Break My Heart" (Larry Carlton, Carl Burnett) – 4:00
 "I Still Believe (feat. Wendy Molten)" (Christopher Bolden / J.B. Eckl)– 4:00
 " Morning Magic" (Larry Carlton, Carl Burnett)– 4:17
  "It's a Groove Thang"  – 4:45
 "Closer to Home" – 3:48
 "I Can't Tell You Why (feat. Shai)" (Glenn Frey / Don Henley / Timothy B. Schmit) – 4:27
 "Like Butta'" – 5:07
 "Roll with It" (Brian Holland / Will Jennings / Steve Winwood) – 5:23
 "Put It Where You Want It" [Extended Version] (Bonus Track) (Larry Carlton, Joe Sample) – 10:38

Personnel
Larry Carlton - guitar, arrangements
Chris Kent - bass (1/11, 6, 7, 9)
Larry Kimpel - bass (4, 10)
Ricky Peterson - organ (1/11); keyboards (4, 10); piano (7); Rhodes electric piano, organ (9)
Deron Johnson - organ (2)
Rick Jackson - Wurlitzer electric piano (1/11); keyboards (6); Rhodes electric piano (7); piano (9)
Carl Burnett - keyboards, programming (2, 5); drum programming, bass, rhythm guitar (2)
Rex Rideout - keyboards, drum programming (3)
Larry Williams - add. keyboards (4–9); flute (5); saxophone (5, 10)
Billy Kilson - drums (1/11, 6, 7, 9)
Harvey Mason - drums (4, 10)
Paulinho da Costa - percussion (1/11, 6, 7, 9)
Lenny Castro - percussion (3, 4, 5, 10)
Chris Potter - saxophone (1/11, 6, 7, 9)
Kirk Whalum - saxophone (2, 10)
Dan Higgins - saxophone (6, 9)
Jerry Hey - flugelhorn (5); trumpet (6, 9, 10); horns arrangement (10)
Bill Reichenbach - trombone (6, 9)
Andy Martin - trombone (10)
Wendy Moten - vocals (4)
Shai - vocals, keyboards, drum programming (8)
Carl Carwell - background vocals (4)
Sue Ann Carwell - background vocals (4)

Producers
Paul Brown - Engineer, Mixing, Producer
Jerry Hey - Additional Production
Rex Rideout - Additional Production
Drew Bollman- Engineer
Jennifer Brown - Sequencing
Carl Burnett -	Arrangement
Koji Egawa - Digital Editing, Engineer
Steve Genewick - Engineer
Stephen Marcussen - Mastering
Mark Larson - Art Direction, Design
Stewart Whitmore -Digital Editing
Lexy Shroyer - Production Coordination
Señor McGuire - Photography
David Rideau - Engineer

References

External links 
  Album at Last.fm

2001 albums
Larry Carlton albums
Warner Records albums